The Republic of Artsakh is an unrecognised republic in the South Caucasus. The region is considered by the UN to be part of Azerbaijan, but is under the control of ethnic Armenian separatists. The Republic of Artsakh controls most of the territory of the former Nagorno-Karabakh Autonomous Oblast.

The telecommunications sector was developed with Karabakh Telecom investing millions of dollars in mobile telephony, spearheaded by a Lebanese company.  Copper and gold mining has been advancing since 2002 with development and launch of operations at Drmbon deposit. Approximately 27–28 thousand tons (wet weight) of concentrates are produced with average copper content of 19–21% and gold content of 32–34 g/t. The banking system is administered by Artsakhbank (the state bank) and a number of Armenian banks. The republic primarily uses the Armenian dram, while the Artsakh dram is also considered legal tender.

Wine growing and processing of agricultural products, particularly wine (i.e., storage of wine, wine stuff, cognac alcohol) is one of the prioritized directions of the economic development.

Notable firms 
This list includes notable companies with primary headquarters located in the country. The industry and sector follow the Industry Classification Benchmark taxonomy. Organizations which have ceased operations are included and noted as defunct.

Wine-brandy-vodka producers in Artsakh
Artsakh is the 10th province of the historic Kingdom of Armenia. The region is known for wine-making since ancient times, especially the southern part, now mostly under Azerbaijani control, where the Artsakh vineyards are mainly found. It is home to the Khndoghni/Sireni grape variety. The climate of the region combined with its fertile soil allows to produce a unique variety of grapes, at an average height of 800 meters above sea level. Many wine karases (jugs) dating back to the 7th century, were found in the archaeological sites near the village of Togh, now under Azerbaijani control. 
 Stepanakert Brandy Factory, operating since 1931 in Stepanakert with branches in Yerevan, Martuni and Karmir Shuka. The company produces a variety of cognac under the brand Madatoff, wine under the brand Berdashen, and fruit vodka under the brand Karabakh.
 Artsakh Brandy Company, opened in 1998 in Aygestan village of Askeran Region. The factory produces a variety of cognac under the brand Artsakh Ohanyan, fruit brandy under the brand Artsakh, wine under the brand Artsakh Shushi, and vodka under the brand Ohanyan.
 Kataro Winery of Anush-1 Company, opened in 2010 in Togh village of Hadrut Region, now under Azerbaijani control. The winery produced a variety of Khndogni/Sireni wine from the vineyards of pre-2020 Artsakh, under the brand Kataro.
 Mika-Hadrut Winery, in Hadrut, Hadrut Region,now under Azerbaijani control, produced a variety of cognac, wine and vodka under the brand Mika.
 Askeran Wine, in Askeran, Askeran Region, for wine and vodka.
 Aragil Winery, in Shekher, Martuni Region, produces the Shekher wine. 
 Balasanyan Winery, in Askeran, Askeran Region, produces the Tat U Pap wine and vodka.
 Lia Cooperative, in Martakert, Martakert Region, produces the Martakert wine.
 Hayrapetyan Brothers Winery, in Karmir Shuka village of Martuni Region, produces a variety of wine.
 Piank Winery, in Khramort, Askeran Region, produces the Vanqasar wine.
 Tnjri-2000" Cooperative, in Martuni, Martuni Region, produces a variety of wine.

See also 
 Economy of the Republic of Artsakh
 List of companies of Armenia

References 

Artsakh, Republic of
 
Companies
Companies